Sri Jayendra Saraswathy Vidhyalaya Matriculation Higher Secondary School is a school located near Ondipudur, Singanallur in Coimbatore.  The principal of the school is Jayis Kurilla, she is Biology teacher.

References 

High schools and secondary schools in Tamil Nadu
Schools in Coimbatore